Zrinka Cvitešić (born 18 July 1979) is a Croatian film, television and theatre actress.

Biography 
The elder of two daughters, Zrinka Cvitešić was born in Karlovac, in the Karlovac County to Ivan and Višnja Cvitešić. Her mother played organ in a local Catholic parish near her hometown. Cvitešić started acting at elementary school and her first role was Cinderella. As a theatre actress, she has been a member of the Croatian National Theatre since 2005. In April 2013, Cvitešić made her West End debut at the Phoenix Theatre in London as "Girl" in the musical Once. Her performance received rave reviews, and she won Laurence Olivier Award for Best Actress in a Musical.

For her performance in the 2005 film What Is a Man Without a Moustache?, Cvitešić won awards for best actress in a leading role both at the 53rd Pula Film Festival and the 11th Sarajevo Film Festival. She received the Shooting Stars Award, the annual acting award for up-and-coming actors by European Film Promotion, at the 60th Berlin International Film Festival in 2010. Cvitešić has been a recipient of Golden Arena, the top prize at Pula Film Festival for her work in the film On the Path.

Personal life 
Cvitešić was in relationship with Croatian musician Hrvoje Rupčić, but they broke up in 2014. She has been dating footballer Niko Kranjčar since they met in 2014.

Filmography

Movie roles

Television roles

References

External links
 

1979 births
Living people
People from Karlovac
Croatian film actresses
Croatian stage actresses
Croatian television actresses
21st-century Croatian women singers
Golden Arena winners
Laurence Olivier Award winners
Musical theatre actresses